Rita Dutta Chakraborty is a Bengali film and television actress. She has acted in movies like Krantikaal, Alo. She played the role of Aarati in Star Jalsha's popular serial Maa. Rita is also a Bengali reciter.

Filmography

Television

See also 
 Laboni Sarkar
 Churni Ganguly

References

Actresses in Bengali cinema
Bengali television actresses
Actresses from Kolkata
Indian film actresses
Indian television actresses
21st-century Indian actresses
Indian spoken word artists
Living people
1956 births